The Bay of Tangier is a bay around Tangier on the Mediterranean in northern Morocco. It forms the body of water between the port and Cap Malabata in a semi circular shape. Avenue d'Espagne runs along the bay and is known for its hotels and large modern establishments.

References

Tangier
Bodies of water of Morocco
Bays of Africa
Bays of the Mediterranean